The 1988–89 Primera División de Fútbol Profesional season is the 37th tournament of El Salvador's Primera División since its establishment of the National League system in 1948. The tournament was scheduled to end on April 2, 1989.  Luis Angel Firpo, the best team in the final group, won the championship match against Cojutepeque, the best regular season team.

Teams

Managerial changes

During the season

League standings

Final round standings

Final

Top scorers

List of foreign players in the league
This is a list of foreign players in 1988-1989. The following players:
have played at least one apetura game for the respective club.
have not been capped for the El Salvador national football team on any level, independently from the birthplace

Acajutla
  Eraldo Correia
   Asdrúbal Padin
  Raul Esnal

ADET
 

C.D. Águila
   Joao Cabral Filho
  Ned Barbosa
  Eduardo Santana 
  Juan Carlos Carreño
  Ramón Maradiaga 
  Nahún Corro

Alianza F.C.
  Óscar Biegler 
  Patrocinio Sierra 
  Hernán Sosa

Atletico Marte
  Enrique Daniel Urberti

 (player released mid season)
  (player Injured mid season)
 Injury replacement player

Chalatenango
  Arnaldo Martínez
  Marco Pereira

Cojutepeque
  Percibal Piggot
  Ruben Guevara

C.D. FAS
  Rogelio Flores
  Ademar Benítez
  Robert Brites
  Héctor Cedrés
  Luis Alberto Heiman

C.D. Luis Ángel Firpo
  Fernando De Moura
  Martín Duffo
  Miguel Seminario

Metapan
  Tomás Rochez 
  Raúl Centeno Gamboa
  Domingo Droummond

External links
 
 
 
 

1988